Benbulbin, sometimes Benbulben or Ben Bulben, is a large flat-topped nunatak rock formation in County Sligo, Ireland. It is part of the Dartry Mountains, in an area sometimes called "Yeats Country".

Benbulbin is a protected site, designated as a County Geological Site by Sligo County Council.

Etymology
"Benbulbin", "Benbulben" and "Ben Bulben" are all anglicisations of the Irish name "Binn Ghulbain". "Binn" means "peak" or "mountain", while "Ghulbain" may mean beak or jaw, or may refer to Conall Gulban, a son of Niall of the Nine Hostages who was associated with the mountain.

Geology

Formation
Benbulbin was shaped during the ice age, when Ireland was under glaciers. Originally it was a large plateau. Glaciers moving from the northeast to southwest shaped it into its present distinct formation.

Rock composition
Benbulbin, and the Dartry Mountains as a whole, are composed of limestones on top of mudstones. These rocks formed in the area approximately 345-330 million years ago in the Viséan Stage of the Carboniferous Period. The environment was a shallow sea. Uppermost in the limestone layer is a thicker, harder limestone called the Dartry Limestone Formation. Below this is a thinner transitional limestone formation – the Glencar Limestone Formation. Further down, the lower slopes consist of shaly mudstone known as the Benbulben Shale Formation. Scree deposits are found near the base.

Fossils exist throughout the layers of the mountains. All layers have many fossilised sea shells. The shale layer also holds some corals.

Baryte was mined at Glencarbury near Benbulbin in the Dartry range between 1894 and 1979.

Climbing

Benbulbin is an established walking destination. If climbed by the north face, it is a hazardous climb. That side bears the brunt of the high winds and storms that come in from the Atlantic Ocean. However, if approached by the south side, it is an easy walk, since that side slopes very gently. From the summit there are views over the coastal plain of north County Sligo and the Atlantic ocean.
The land adjacent to the western edge of the ridge is privately owned farmland and not accessible to the general public.  However, there is a paved path up the south face to the east near Glencar Waterfall just over the County Leitrim border.

Walking
One of the trails running alongside Benbulbin mountain is the Gortarowey looped walk. It runs both through the forest and out in the open overlooking Benbulbin and the bay of Donegal.

Flora and fauna
Benbulbin hosts a variety of plants, including some organisms found nowhere else in Ireland. Many are Arctic–alpine plants, due to the mountain's height, which allows for cooler temperatures than is normal. These plants were established after the glaciers that created Benbulbin melted. Wild hares and foxes inhabit Benbulbin.

In 2012, research revealed that the fringed sandwort had survived the Ice Age and is perhaps 100,000 years old. In Ireland the plant is unique to Benbulbin. The discovery calls into question the prior consensus that Ireland's flora and fauna date from or after the end of the Ice Age.

In Irish history

Irish legends
Benbulbin is the setting of several Irish legends. It is said to be one of the hunting grounds of the Fianna, a band of warriors who are said to have lived in the 3rd century. One example is the story of The Pursuit of Diarmuid and Gráinne, in which the warrior Diarmuid Ua Duibhne (Diarmuid) is tricked by the giant Fionn mac Cumhaill (Finn McCool) into fighting an enchanted boar, which later kills the warrior by piercing his heart with its tusk. McCool is also said to have found his long-lost son Oisín at this location. The mountain is said to be Diarmuid and Gráinne's resting place. Also, in the 6th century, St. Columba fought a battle on the plain below Benbulbin at Cúl Dreimhne (Cooladrumman) for the right to copy a Psalter he had borrowed from St. Finnian.

Irish Civil War
On 20 September 1922, during the Irish Civil War, an Irish Republican Army column, including an armoured car were cornered in Sligo. The car was destroyed by another armoured car belonging to the Irish Free State's National Army, and six of the IRA soldiers fled up the Benbulbin's slopes. In the end, all were killed, allegedly after they had surrendered. They are known as the "Noble Six". Brigadier Seamus Devins TD, Div. Adj. Brian MacNeill, Capt. Harry Benson, Lieut. Paddy Carroll, Vols. Tommy Langan and Joe Banks were those killed on the mountain. The six anti-treaty fighters were hunted down on the slopes of Benbulbin and put to death by Free State forces which were out to avenge the killing of Brigadier Joseph Ring eight days earlier. Two of those killed and Ring were ancestors of current and recent politicians: Ring is the grand uncle of Michael Ring, McNeill is the uncle of former Tánaiste and Minister for Justice, Equality and Law Reform Michael McDowell and Devins is the grandfather of Jimmy Devins. Mary O'Rourke once narrated a radio documentary telling how her grandmother's home was used as a safehouse.

Plane crashes
During World War II there were two plane crashes in the Dartry mountains close to Benbulbin.

On 9 December 1943, a USAAF Boeing B-17G Flying Fortress plane (en route from Goose Bay, Labrador to Prestwick, Scotland) crashed on Truskmore just east of Benbulbin. 10 airmen were aboard, of whom three died, two at the scene and one from injuries sustained in the crash. Local residents undertook a rescue mission, taking the injured off the mountain where they were then transferred to Sligo County Hospital. Substantial wreckage of the plane stayed on the mountain for many years following the crash and today limited amounts of aircraft fragments still remain at the site.

Near the location of the Flying Fortress crash, there was an earlier crash also involving a military aircraft. On 21 March 1941, an RAF Catalina flying boat (AM265) using the Donegal Corridor crashed into the mountain at Glenade, Co. Leitrim on the east side of Truskmore. All nine airmen aboard died in the crash.

Recent history
In the 1970s and 1980s, Sinn Féin had engaged in a slogan campaign around the theme 'Brits out of Ireland'. Roads and walls throughout Ireland had been marked with these slogans as was Benbulbin in 1977. It was marked first with 'Brits Out' (180 ft wide and 25 ft high) and then later with the slogan 'H-Block'.

Benbulbin overlooks the village of Mullaghmore, the site of the assassination of Lord Mountbatten in 1979.

As stated above, Benbulbin is a protected site, designated as a County Geological Site by Sligo County Council. However, in May 2018, 'Vote No' (8th amendment) campaigners erected a large "NO" sign, severely impacting the iconic view. Sligo County Council responded on social media with the following statement, "As the land where the lettering was placed is commonage, Sligo County Council has no role in this matter". The sign was removed the next day

Notable people
The athlete Mary Cullen is from nearby Drumcliffe. 
Andy "The Bull" McSharry, involved in a famous 17-year-long dispute over allowing access rights over his land, lives near Benbulbin.

In literature
Benbulbin features prominently in the poetry of W. B. Yeats, after whom Yeats Country is named. County Sligo is considered integral to the poet's work. The mountain is one of the destinations on the Passport Trail of the poet's life.

Yeats wrote the following in The Celtic Twilight: 

The mountain is also mentioned in Yeats's On a Political Prisoner, in which he recalls the Countess Markiewicz riding past it to political meetings.
 
Yeats's famous poem, Under Ben Bulben, is essentially a description of Yeats Country. It describes the sights that he saw in Yeats Country.
The following is an excerpt from Under Ben Bulben:

This was Yeats's final poem, published in The Irish Times. He is buried in Drumcliffe Churchyard, in the shadow of Benbulbin.

Gallery

See also

 List of mountains in Ireland
 Wiktionary definition of a ben

References

External links
 Tourist information 
 An image of Benbulbin with a small caption
 Information, pictures and a panorama of Benbulbin
 Hiking the Benbulben and the old coal mine
 Sinn Féin Anti British Slogans 1977

Yeats
 An essay on the Benbulbin in Yeats' poetry
 A second site detailing Benbulbin in Yeats' poetry
 Reading of "Under Ben Bulben" by Jim Norton on RTÉ Radio 1

Marilyns of Ireland
Mountains and hills of County Sligo